The Rions are an Australian four-piece indie rock band from the Northern Beaches, New South Wales. The band consists of Noah Blockley (lead vocals, bass guitar), Harley Wilson (guitar), Asher McLean (guitar), and Tom Partington (drums). In 2021, they were announced as the winners of Australian national youth broadcaster Triple J's Unearthed High competition for their song "Night Light". Musically, they are an indie rock and pop band, and cite fellow Northern Beaches bands Lime Cordiale and Ocean Alley as influences.

Career
The Rions formed in 2016, consisting of lead vocalist and bass guitarist, Noah Blockley, guitarists Harley Wilson and Asher McLean, and drummer Tom Partington.

On 9 April 2021, they released the single "Night Light". On 19 August, the Rions were announced as the winner's Australian youth broadcaster Triple J's Unearthed High competition for their song "Night Light". Included as part of their prize was a mentoring session with duo Lime Cordiale and a support slot on fellow Unearthed High winner George Alice's next national tour. On 1 December 2021, they released the single "Disassociation". Alongside the announcement, the band revealed that they had signed with UNIFIED Music Group.

Band members
Current members
 Noah Blockley – lead vocals, bass guitar
 Harley Wilson – guitar
 Asher McLean – guitar
 Tom Partington – drums

Musical style and influences
The Rions have been described as indie rock and pop. They have been likened to the Vanns, in addition to fellow Northern Beaches acts Lime Cordiale and Ocean Alley. They list Ani DiFranco, Arctic Monkeys, Aretha Franklin, Bryan Adams, Leon Bridges, Ray Charles, Stevie Wonder, and the Beatles as musical influences.

Discography

Awards and nominations

Unearthed High

! 
|-
! scope="row"| 2021
| Themselves
| Unearthed High Competition
| 
| 
|}

References

External links
 

2016 establishments in Australia
Australian alternative rock groups
Australian indie rock groups
Australian pop music groups
Musical groups established in 2016
Musical groups from Northern Beaches
Musical quartets
Musicians from Sydney